

France
 Afars and Issas
 Commissioner – Christian Dablanc, High Commissioner of the Afars and Issas (1974–1976)
 Governing Council – Ali Aref Bourhan, President of the Governing Council (1967–1976)

Portugal
 Angola – 
 António Alva Rosa Coutinho, High Commissioner of Angola (1974–1975)
 António Silva Cardoso, High Commissioner of Angola (1975)
 Ernesto Ferreira de Macedo, High Commissioner of Angola (1975)
 Leonel Silva Cardoso, High Commissioner of Angola (1975)
 Angola granted independence on 11 November

United Kingdom
 Ellice Islands – 
 Separated from Gilbert Island, 1 October
 Commissioner – Thomas Laying, Commissioner of Ellice Islands (1975–1978)
 Prime Minister – Toaripi Lauti, Chief Minister of Ellice Islands (1975–1978)
 Hong Kong
Governor – Lord MacLehose of Beoch, Governor of Hong Kong (1971–1982)

Colonial governors
Colonial governors
1975